Parliamentary elections were held in Romania on 28 March 1948.  They were the first elections held under in undisguised Communist rule; the Communist-dominated legislature had declared Romania a people's republic after King Michael was forced to abdicate in December 1947.

With all meaningful opposition having been eliminated, the People's Democratic Front, dominated by the Communist Romanian Workers Party (PMR) received 93.2% of the vote and won 405 of the 414 seats in the Great National Assembly. Within the Front, the PMR and its allies won a total of 201 seats, seven short of a majority in its own right. Rump liberal and peasant parties appeared on the ballot, between them receiving 3.5 percent of the vote and winning nine seats.

Background
In 1945, the Soviet Union all but forced King Michael to appoint Petru Groza as Prime Minister. Soviet emissary Andrei Vyshinsky had warned the king that he would be placing Romania's very existence at risk unless he complied. The following year, Groza's pro-Communist government oversaw an election that resulted in a legislature in which the Communist-dominated Bloc of Democratic Parties won over four-fifths of the seats (over 91 percent counting the BPD's allies). The election was far from free; Communist unions hindered delivery of opposition newspapers, and Communist operatives harassed opposition workers. 

Over the next two years, the Communists, with Groza's help, consolidated their hold on the country. The turning point came in the second half of 1947, when the government initiated a campaign of harsh repression against the remaining opposition parties. The National Peasants' Party and National Liberal Party, the two largest opposition parties, were dissolved by the government. The National Peasants' leaders, Iuliu Maniu and Ion Mihalache, were tried on charges of plotting to overthrow the government in the Tămădău Affair, and were both sentenced to life imprisonment. On 30 December, Groza and Communist leader Gheorghe Gheorghiu-Dej confronted Michael and forced his abdication. Michael and his personal counselor would later claim this was done with the help of a detachment of troops from the pro-Communist Tudor Vladimirescu Division. Hours later, the Communist-dominated legislature abolished the monarchy and proclaimed Romania a "people's republic". 

A month before the elections, the Communists and part of the Social Democrats merged to form the Romanian Workers' Party (PMR). However, Communists retained key posts in the new party, and used the principle of democratic centralism to ensure that the Social Democratic part of the new party complied with the new order. The Social Democratic half was gradually pushed out altogether, leaving the PMR as the PCR under a new name. At the same time, the National Democratic Front, an electoral alliance dominated by the PMR, was reorganized as the People's Democratic Front. The Front rapidly took on a character similar to other "national fronts" in the emerging Soviet bloc. The front's minor parties became completely subservient to the PMR, and had to accept the PMR's "leading role" as a condition of their continued existence. Despite this, Groza, leader of one of those minor parties, the Ploughmen's Front, remained prime minister.

Results

Aftermath
A month after the elections, the legislature, now a pliant rubber stamp of the Communists, adopted a new constitution. While all power was nominally derived from the will of the people through the GNA, in practice power was exercised by the PMR, which itself was closely supervised by the Kremlin. Soon afterwards, all parties outside the People's Democratic Front ceased to exist, though Romania had effectively been a single-party state since the monarchy was abolished in December.

Notes

References

Parliamentary elections in Romania
Romania
Legislative election
Romania
Legislative election